Aulis Juhani Akonniemi (born December 16, 1958) is a retired shot putter from Finland, born in Soini. He competed for his native country at the 1984 Summer Olympics, finishing in 9th place (18.98 metres) in the overall-standings.

References
 sports-reference

1958 births
Living people
People from Soini
Finnish male shot putters
Olympic athletes of Finland
Athletes (track and field) at the 1984 Summer Olympics
Sportspeople from South Ostrobothnia